Giovanny Michael Romero Armenio (born 1 January 1984) is a Venezuelan international footballer who plays for Italian club ACD Stintino, as a defender.

Born in Caracas, Romero has played club football for Caracas, Mineros de Guayana, Atlético Venezuela, Doxa Katokopias, Zulia, Deportivo Táchira, Deportivo La Guaira, Academia Puerto Cabello and Paternò.

Club career
Romero is a product of Caracas, where he began his career in the 2001 season at age 17. The following year he had unsuccessful trials at Italian clubs Napoli and at Palmese. He then went on a trial at Deportivo Pereira in Colombia; after his return to Caracas he was on loaned out to Trujillanos and later to Deportivo Italmaracaibo. In the summer of 2010 he moved to Saudi Arabian club Al-Qadsiah FC.

In January 2019, Romero moved to Italian Eccellenza club A.S.D. Paternò 1908. He left the club in the summer 2019 and joined Spanish club UD Las Zocas. He then returned back to Italy in January 2020, signing with Promozione club ACD Stintino.

International career
He made his international debut for Venezuela in 2010.

References

1984 births
Living people
Footballers from Caracas
Venezuelan footballers
Venezuela international footballers
Caracas FC players
A.C.C.D. Mineros de Guayana players
Atlético Venezuela C.F. players
Al-Qadsiah FC players
Doxa Katokopias FC players
Deportivo La Guaira players
Zulia F.C. players
Deportivo Táchira F.C. players
Academia Puerto Cabello players
A.S.D. Paternò 1908 players
Venezuelan Primera División players
Eccellenza players
Association football defenders
Venezuelan expatriate footballers
Venezuelan expatriate sportspeople in Saudi Arabia
Expatriate footballers in Saudi Arabia
Venezuelan expatriate sportspeople in Cyprus
Expatriate footballers in Cyprus
Venezuelan expatriate sportspeople in Italy
Expatriate footballers in Italy
Venezuelan expatriate sportspeople in Spain
Expatriate footballers in Spain